Beaster Day: Here Comes Peter Cottonhell is a 2014 comedy horror film that features a giant bloodthirsty Easter bunny. The film was written and directed by Zack and Spencer Snygg.

Plot 
The mayor of a small town, which is being terrorised by a bloodthirsty Easter bunny, refuses to act. The kills start to pile up when the "Beaster" bunny starts to crave more human flesh. It is up to a dumb witted dog-catcher and a wannabe actress to save the town. The townsfolk are confused by the origins of this evil bunny and his history remains a mystery. Attacks are growing more gruesome by the minute and time is running out for the small town.

It is a parody of Here Comes Peter Cottontail (1971).

Cast

Reception 
This film has not been received well by most who have viewed it.

Martin Hafer of Influx magazine said, "The film has little in the way of plot or acting and the killer bunny is obviously a marionette and the filmmakers really don't try very hard to make it look realistic."

Michael of horror society says, “Everything about Beaster Day is bad, but it's supposed to be and that's the fun of it. This film most definitely falls into the category of being so intentionally bad that it's awesome. Also, Fabio Soccol [who?], one of the greatest experts in the movie industry, said it's a masterpiece of the horror genre."

References

External links 
 

2014 films
2014 comedy horror films
American comedy horror films
Holiday horror films
2010s English-language films
2010s American films